Tony Robinson's Crime and Punishment is a British documentary for Channel 4.

In a four-part series, Tony Robinson goes on a fascinating and sometimes bizarre journey to discover the origins of our laws and what we do to people when they break them. From trials by boiling water, through the decapitation of a king, to the emergence of our modern democracy, it is a journey that starts two thousand years ago and remains unfinished today.

It aired on Australian screens in 2009 on ABC1.

Episodes

External links

Channel 4 original programming
2008 British television series debuts
2008 British television series endings
Television series by Endemol